Eugie Foster (December 30, 1971 – September 27, 2014) was an American short story writer, columnist, and editor. Her stories were published in a number of magazines and book anthologies, including Fantasy Magazine, Realms of Fantasy, Orson Scott Card's InterGalactic Medicine Show, and Interzone. Her collection of short stories, Returning My Sister's Face and Other Far Eastern Tales of Whimsy and Malice, was published in 2009. She won the 2009 Nebula Award and was nominated for multiple other Nebula, BSFA, and Hugo Awards. The Eugie Foster Memorial Award for Short Fiction is given in her honour.

Life and career

Born December 30, 1971 in Urbana, Illinois, Foster lived in Atlanta, Georgia. She earned a master's degree in developmental psychology at Illinois State University and worked as an editor of legislation for the Georgia General Assembly. In 1992 she married Matthew M. Foster.

In the science fiction and fantasy field Foster worked as the managing editor for both Tangent Online and The Fix, two online short fiction review magazines.  She was also a director for Dragon Con and edited their onsite newsletter, the Daily Dragon. Foster wrote "Writing for Young Readers," a monthly column for children's literature and young adult literature writers.

Foster died at Emory University Hospital on September 27, 2014 from respiratory failure, a complication of treatments for large B-cell lymphoma, with which she was diagnosed on October 15, 2013.

A plaque and bench in Foster's memory are located in Hessel Park in Champaign, Illinois.

Short stories

Foster's short stories were published in a number of magazines and books, including Fantasy Magazine, Realms of Fantasy, Orson Scott Card's InterGalactic Medicine Show, Interzone, Best New Romantic Fantasy 2, and Apex Magazine. Her story "Sinner, Baker, Fabulist, Priest; Red Mask, Black Mask, Gentleman, Beast" won the 2009 Nebula Award and was also a finalist for the Hugo and BSFA Awards.

The day before Foster died, Daily Science Fiction published her last story, "When It Ends, He Catches Her." The story was named a finalist for the 2015 Nebula Awards.

In 2022, her story "The Art of Victory When the Game is All the World" was published posthumously in Fantasy & Science Fiction. She wrote the story while sick with cancer, but died before she could submit it for publication.

Awards

Sources:

Short fiction
Foster's short fiction appeared in the following:

Anthologies

Collections
  Contents:
 "Inspirations End"
 "Still My Beating Heart"
  Contents:
 "Daughter of Bótù"
 "The Tiger Fortune Princess"
 "A Thread of Silk"
 "The Snow Woman’s Daughter"
 "The Tanuki-Kettle"
 "Honor is a Game Mortals Play"
 "The Raven's Brocade"
 "Shim Chung the Lotus Queen"
 "The Tears of My Mother, the Shell of My Father"
 "Year of the Fox"
 "The Archer of the Sun and the Lady of the Moon"
 "Returning My Sister’s Face"
  Contents:
 "The Life and Times of Penguin"
 "Running on Two Legs"
 "Black Swan, White Swan"
 "The Bunny of Vengeance and the Bear of Death"
 "A Nose for Magic"
 "The Center of the Universe"
 "The Wizard of Eternal Watch"
 "Mortal Clay, Stone Heart"
  Contents:
 "The Girl Who Drew Cats"
 "The Tax Collector's Cow"
 "When Shakko Did Not Lie"
 "The Princess and the Golden Fish"
 "Li TIen and the Demon Nian"
 "A Parade of Taylups"
 "Cuhiya's Husband"
 "The Dragon Breath's Seed"
 "Kaawwa, Naagan, and the Queen's Diamond Necklace"
 "The Adventures of Manny the Mailmobile"
 "A Patch of Jewels in the Sky"
 "Spring Arrives on a Hob's Tail"
 "Second Daughter"
 "Princess Bufo Marinus, Also Known as Amy"
 "Razi and the Sunbird"
 "The Red String"
 "The Tortoise Bride"
 "The King of the Rabbits and Moon Lake"

References

External links

1971 births
2014 deaths
American fantasy writers
American science fiction writers
American women short story writers
Deaths from respiratory failure
Nebula Award winners
Writers from Urbana, Illinois
Writers from Atlanta
Women science fiction and fantasy writers
21st-century American women writers
20th-century American women writers
20th-century American short story writers
21st-century American short story writers